Under the Merovingians and Carolingians, the fisc (from Latin fiscus, whence we derive "fiscal") applied to the royal demesne which paid taxes, entirely in kind, from which the royal household was meant to be supported, though it rarely was. Though their personal territory was at first enormous, the Merovingian kings, faced with stiff resistance to taxation from their Frankish and Gallo-Roman subjects and ill-served by their illiterate peers, relied on constant conquests to renew the fisc which they were in the habit of granting away to ensure continued fidelity among their followers. Once fresh Frankish conquests were no longer forthcoming, constant redivision of the "fisc" among heirs reduced Merovingian kingship to a cluster of competitive kinglets subsisting on inadequate resources. Annual contributions in kind, of grain, produce, fodder, etc., were unwieldy to transport and not easily convertible, so the restless habit of Merovingian kings moving from stronghold to stronghold was constantly encouraged. As time passed, "fisc" began to refer to money any Frankish knight had direct control over and would carry with him.  Eventually, "fisc" referred to any knight's money holder.

Nowadays, "fisc" is still used in French and in Romanian as a slang referring to the fiscal administration. In Spanish, the slang word "fisco" is also used, while the German term is "Fiskus" and the Dutch term is "fiscus".

Francia
History of taxation
Fiscal policy
Medieval economics